Tongyang Broadcasting Company (TBC, 1964-1980) was a South Korean commercial television station which was merged by the government with KBS. It was owned by the Samsung Group founder Lee Byung-chul.

History

Founding philosophy

Early developments
It was reported in September 1962 that preparations were being made for the first TV commercial broadcast in Korea. According to the article, Tongyang TV Broadcasting Co., Ltd. was ready to transmit radio waves using purely Korean technology, having secured three cameras and one relay vehicle, and applied before the Korean government for broadcasting frequencies. In January of the following year, it was reported that it was scheduled to establish in May by being assigned channel 7 with permission from the authorities. However, the launch was postponed, and in July of that year, chairman Lee Jae-hyeong and director Lee Byung-cheol visited Nippon Television's president and asked for assistance, such as technical assistance. At that time, the government showed willingness to produce TV receivers and transmitters in Korea, except for parts that could not be manufactured, and the first TV cameras from Tongyang Broadcasting Station were also produced by combining movie cameras and used devices.

Sign-on and operations
On May 9, 1964, Tongyang Radio was launched, and on December 7, 1964, Tongyang Television (with headquarters in Seoul on VHF channel 7 followed by a branch in Busan on channel 9 on December 12, 1964), on January 15, 1966 it changed from JoongAng (Central) Broadcasting Co., Ltd. to Tongyang Broadcasting, and on August 15 of the following year, Tongyang Standard FM was launched. Tongyang Broadcasting has garnered attention with popular variety shows including Show Show Show and various soap operas since the establishment of TBC-TV and even surpassed the ratings of KBS, which was a state-run broadcaster, and MBC was dominant even after TV set up, despite MBC having several hit dramas. However, as a whole, Tongyang Broadcasting slightly outperformed MBC.

In the late 1960s, foreign loans of more than US$870,000 were introduced to expand the facility. In July 1969, the Apollo 11 moon landings were broadcast live on TV and radio. In 1971, the nominal capital of Tongyang Broadcasting was valued at 400 million won. In the early 1970s, a transmission tower was established in partnership with Dong-A Broadcasting and Munhwa Broadcasting. Since 1978, it has grown significantly, including preparing for color television broadcasts. In the case of DTngyang TV's Busan branch, it is impossible to broadcast a direct signal from Seoul (simultaneous transmission) due to the absence of microwaves, focusing on local programs in Busan, Ulsan, and Gyeongsangnam-do. Therefore, the Seoul (key station) programs such as 'Show Show Show' were broadcast by air or railroad (overland), and broadcasts were delayed by one week, contributing to strengthening the independence of local broadcasting.

Media consolidation

In November 1980, Tongyang Broadcasting was forced to consolidate to KBS at 00:00 on December 1, 1980, following the media consolidation measures carried out by Heo Mun-do after the 12.12 incident and the military forces came into power. TBC Radio was split into two with the AM frequency becoming KBS Radio 3 and the FM frequency became KBS 2FM, and TBC TV became KBS 2TV. Tongyang Broadcasting disappeared. At the time of the merger and acquisition, Tongyang Broadcasting's assets amounted to 34 billion won. Dong-A Broadcasting's was about 4.2 billion won, and other broadcasts were less than 1 billion. Later, JoongAng Ilbo estimated the assets at the time to be 70 billion won.

After the media consolidation
In October 1988, just before the No. 5 government investigation led by the Roh Tae-woo government and just before the hearing of the Fifth Republic, the “Tongyang Broadcasting Revitalization Promotion Committee” was formed and adopted a resolution calling for a revival of its operations.

On November 26, 1990, JoongAng Ilbo submitted an application for compensation to the Seoul District Prosecutors 'Office of Seoul District Prosecutors' Office to pay compensation of KRW 860 billion for damages incurred from the forced transfer of Tongyang Broadcasting to the Korean Broadcasting System and the state. The committee rejected 14 companies including the JoongAng Ilbo for compensation for damages after three years of lapse.

On November 30, 2009, 19 years later, about 400 people, including former TBC officials and entertainers, held a 'Prayer for the Restoration of Tongyang Broadcasting' and adopted the resolution to encourage JoongAng Ilbo to advance into the general entertainment channel business. The JoongAng Ilbo insisted that its long-term JTBC was the successor to TBC before the Korea Communications Commission's selection process for the generalist channel, and was closed on November 30, 1980. It was launched on December 1, 2011 in commemoration of 31st anniversary of TBC's shutdown.

89.1 MHz, the FM frequency of Tongyang Radio, became KBS 2FM on December 1, 1980, and the TV callsign of the Busan branch of Dongyang Broadcasting was reorganized to KBS Busan 2TV.

Television shows
 Show Show Show
 Long live the long life
 Hodolyi and Tosuni
 Gayo Olympics
 TBC Quiz King
 Classical Theatre of humor
 Okay good group
 Sincerely, TBC
 TBC News Plaza (Now KBS News Plaza)
 TBC 6 News (Now KBS News 6)
 TBC Seokkan (TBC Evening, 1972-1980; known as TBC Report 1976-1978)

Radio programs
 Lee Deok-hwa and Im Ye-jin's 10PM Chunbangjichuk Radio
 I Like Radio
 Good Morning Happiness Touch
 Music Date
 Daebak! Music Trend
 FM Hall Of Fame
 The Latest Music
 Changinkut Radio!
 Music Today
 Issues and People
 Radio Request
 FM Today
 TBC News Morning
 TBC ALL THAT CHART TOP 50
 TBC Newsline
 FM Latest Inkigayo
 TBC News 2
 TBC 12 News
 TBC News 7
 TBC Afternoon Drama (at 12:30PM KST)
 TBC Primetime Drama (at 07:30PM KST)
 TBC Monday-Tuesday Drama (at 06:00~07:00PM KST)
 TBC Wednesday-Thursday Drama (at 06:00~07:00PM KST)
 TBC Friday Drama (at 06:00~07:00PM KST)

See also
 Korean Broadcasting System
 KBS2
 KBS Cool FM
 JTBC
JoongAng Ilbo
Samsung
Lee Byung-chul
 Chun Doo-hwan
 Policy for Merger and Abolition of the Press

References

Broadcasting companies of South Korea
Television channels in South Korea
Television channels and stations established in 1964
Television channels and stations disestablished in 1980
Defunct mass media in South Korea
Radio stations established in 1964
Radio stations disestablished in 1980